Roman Stepanovych Smal-Stocki (Роман Степанович Смаль-Стоцький) (born: January 8, 1893, Chernivtsi - died April 27, 1969, Washington DC) – was a Ukrainian diplomat, scholar, politician. Ph.D. Professor at the Ukrainian Free University. President of the Supreme Council of the Shevchenko Scientific Society and the Scientific Society in the United States.

He is a son of Ukrainian slavist Stepan Smal-Stotsky.

Education 
Roman Smal-Stocki graduated from Vienna University (1914).

Publications 
 
 Smal-Stocki, Roman, 1893-1969: Abriss der ukrainischen Substantivbildung. (Wien, Buchhandlung der Szewczenko-Gesellschaft der Wissenschaften in Lemberg, 1915) 
 Smal-Stocki, Roman, 1893-1969: Abriss der Ukrainischen Substantivbildung. (Wien, 1915) 
 The captive nations: nationalism of the non-Russian nations in the Soviet Union. Smal-Stocki, Roman, 1893-1969. Book, 1960.
 Ukraïnska mova v Sovetskyĭ Ukrainy by Smal-Stocki, Roman, 1893-1969: 1969, Book 
 The Slavic Institute of Marquette University, 1949-1961, by Roman Smal-Stocki and Alfred J. Sokolnicki.
 
 Slavs and Teutons. The oldest Germanic-Slavic Relations, 1950
 The Nationality Problem of the Soviet Union and Russian Communist Imperialism, 1952
 J. S. C. de Radius. An unknown Forerunner of Comparative Slavic Literature, 1959
 The History of Modern Bulgarian Literature, 1960 [Manning, Clarence A.]

References

External links
 DR. ROMAN SMAL-STOCKI HEADS TARAS SHEVCHENKO MEMORIAL COMMITTEE
 Ukrainians in the United Kingdom Online encyclopaedia
 Citation Styles for "Professor Roman Smal-Stocki and his contributions to the Ukrainian nation : collected papers honoring the late Prof. Roman Smal-Stocki, Ph. D., president of the Supreme Council of the Shevchenko Scientific Societies and the Scientific Society in the U.S.A."

1893 births
1969 deaths
Politicians from Chernivtsi
People from the Duchy of Bukovina
University of Vienna alumni
Ludwig Maximilian University of Munich alumni
Ambassadors of Ukraine to the United Kingdom
Ambassadors of Ukraine to Germany
Linguists from Ukraine
Members of the Shevchenko Scientific Society
Academic staff of the University of Warsaw
Ukrainian Austro-Hungarians
20th-century linguists